Bridget Elizabeth Hitler, née Dowling (alternative Brigid Elisabeth, or Cissie) (3 July 1891 – 18 November 1969), was Adolf Hitler's sister-in-law via her marriage to Alois Hitler, Jr. She was the mother of Alois Hitler's son William Patrick Hitler. She was born and raised in Dublin, Ireland.

Marriage

Engagement
In 1909, Bridget and her father, William Dowling, attended the Dublin Horse Show where they met Alois Hitler junior, who claimed to be a wealthy hotelier touring Europe when, in fact, he was a poor kitchen porter at Dublin's Shelbourne Hotel. Alois courted Bridget at various Dublin locales and soon they were discussing marriage. On 3 June 1910, the couple eloped to London, living in Charing Cross Road for a while. Her father threatened to charge Alois with kidnapping but accepted the marriage after Bridget pleaded with him.

Early married life
The couple settled at 102 Upper Stanhope Street, a boarding house kept by the John family, in Toxteth, Liverpool and, in 1911 they had their only child, William Patrick Hitler. The house was destroyed in the last German air raid of the Liverpool Blitz on 10 January 1942. The Hitlers were notable for their love for Everton Football Club during their residency in Liverpool, and it has been confirmed that each family member was a season ticket holder.

Split
Alois went to Germany in 1914 to establish himself in business but these plans were interrupted by the outbreak of World War I. Bridget refused to go with him, as he had become violent and started beating their son. Alois decided to abandon his family. He returned to Germany, remarried bigamously, and sent word after the war that he was dead. His deception was later discovered, and he was charged with bigamy by the German authorities in 1924. He escaped conviction due to Bridget's intervention. Bridget raised her son alone with no support from her husband from whom she was eventually divorced (although as a Roman Catholic she was religiously opposed to divorce). She set up a home in Highgate, North London, and took in lodgers to make ends meet.

Emigration and claims
In 1939, Bridget joined her son on a tour of the United States where he was invited to lecture on his infamous uncle. They decided to stay and Bridget wrote a manuscript, My Brother-in-Law Adolf, in which she claimed that her famous brother-in-law had moved to Liverpool to live with Bridget and Alois from November 1912 to April 1913 to dodge conscription in his native Austria. She claims that she introduced Adolf to astrology and that she advised him to trim off the edges of his moustache.

Adolf Hitler's stay in Liverpool has corroboration from the biographer and friend of British Intelligence chief, Sir William Stephenson, in his book A Man Called Intrepid. Sir William was chief of British Security Coordination (BSC). Biographer William Stevenson states:  "Hitler's little-known sojourn in England between November 1912 and April 1913 is authenticated by BSC documents.”

1912 to mid-1913 has been described as Hitler's 'missing year'. During that period he had been living in homeless men's hostels in Vienna. In his book Hitler, A Life, the historian Peter Longerich confirms that "Indeed, there is hardly any reliable evidence about Hitler's life for the period 1910 to 1913."  The opening sentence of Chapter 4 of Adolf Hitler's book Mein Kampf states: "In the spring of 1912 I came at last to Munich". ("Im Frühjahr 1912 kam ich endgültig nach München.") But Hitler's statement is proven to be false. A Munich police record shows that Hitler moved from Vienna to Munich, aged twenty-four, arriving on Sunday, 25 May 1913.

The question of whether Hitler visited his British relatives in Liverpool is unresolved. Some historians dismiss Bridget's manuscript as being a fabrication written in an attempt to cash in on her famous relationship. However, in his book The Hitlers Of Liverpool, Michael Unger quotes the Canadian historian, Professor Alan Cassels, who wrote "The Merseyside details are certainly circumstantially credible"... "I'm inclined to believe his sister-in-law". Brigitte Hamann and Hans Mommsen say that the few sources from Vienna during this period are "questionable throughout". Professor Robert Waite disputes her claim that Adolf Hitler stayed with her as well as some other claims in her book in the appendix to his book The Psychopathic God: Adolf Hitler. According to David Gardner, Bridget's daughter-in-law has said Bridget admitted to her that the book was fanciful. The story of Adolf Hitler's visit to Liverpool has remained popular, however, and was the subject of Beryl Bainbridge's 1978 novel Young Adolf and Grant Morrison and Steve Yeowell's notorious 1989 comic The New Adventures of Hitler.

Post-war
After the war, Bridget and her son settled in Long Island, New York under the assumed name of Stuart-Houston. She died there on 18 November 1969 and is buried in Holy Sepulchre Cemetery in Coram, Long Island alongside her son, who died on 14 July 1987.

The family of Bridget Dowling remained a mystery until the Irish censuses for 1901 and 1911 were digitised and released online. The names of the family members, including Bridget, are given in the 1901 census under the name William Dowling of Flemings Place, near Mespil Road, Dublin. The family later moved to Denzille Street, Dublin, now named Fenian Street. Bridget's name is not included with the Dowling family on the 1911 census. Instead, she appears as "Cissie Hitler" on the 1911 England and Wales Census, shown with husband "Anton Hitler" and son "William Hitler" at 102 Upper Stanhope Street, Liverpool.

See also
 Hitler family
 Meet the Hitlers

References
Footnotes

Notes

Sources
 Vermeeren, Marc (2007). De jeugd van Adolf Hitler, 1889-1907: en zijn familie en voorouders [The youth of Adolf Hitler, 1889–1907: and his family and ancestors] (in Dutch). Soesterberg: Uitgeverij Aspekt.

External links
 
 Hitler's Irish Relatives by Tony McCarthy
 Getting to know the Hitlers from the Daily Telegraph
 Author talks about 'the Last of the Hitlers' CNN interview
 Irish census record of Bridget Dowling from 1901
 Record of Dowling Family from 1901
 Adolf Hitler living in Liverpool
 

1891 births
1969 deaths
Hitler family
People from Dublin (city)
People from Hornsey
People from Long Island
20th-century Irish writers
20th-century Irish women writers
Irish emigrants to the United States